The men's long jump at the 2019 Asian Athletics Championships was held on 23 and 24 April.

Medalists

Results

Qualification
Qualification rule:  Qualifying performance 8.00 (Q) or at least 12 best performers (q) qualify for the final

Final

References

Long
Long jump at the Asian Athletics Championships